"Angels Would Fall" is a 1999 Melissa Etheridge song and the first single from her album Breakdown.

Song information 

The song was written by Melissa Etheridge with the main guitar loop contributed by John Shanks. It is one of her darkest songs as the singer says herself on the bonus DVD of her album Greatest Hits: The Road Less Traveled:

"Angels Would Fall" is about a desperate crush Etheridge had on someone else's girlfriend during her shattered relationship with Julie Cypher. In the verses, she describes the pain she feels because she can tell nobody about her feelings (“The rope that's wrapped around me is cutting through my skin...”), while in the chorus she is singing the desired person's praises (“Angels never came down [...] but if they knew, if they knew you at all, angels would fall...”).

Music video 

The music video was shot in 1999, and showed Melissa Etheridge playing her song in a dark, empty, saloon-styled bar where the furniture is destroyed like after a fight. In retrospective scenes, nebulous images of people in white dresses come down from the ceiling symbolising the fallen angels. While they fall down, they cause the damage described above. These angels find love in each other, both homosexual and heterosexual couples are formed. Towards the end, the door of the bar opens and the angels go into the light.

Charts 

"Angels Would Fall" was the most successful single of Breakdown. It reached the US Billboard Hot 100, was Etheridge's third consecutive single peaking at #9 on the Adult Top 40 and her fourth consecutive top 10 hit in the Canadian single charts.

Weekly charts

Year-end charts

Track listing 

"Angels Would Fall" (Melissa Etheridge, John Shanks) - 4:39
"Into the Dark" (Etheridge) - 4:59
"Beloved" (Etheridge) - 7:54

Credits and personnel 
Melissa Etheridge - acoustic guitar, vocals
Kenny Aronoff - drums, marimba, shaker
Jon Brion - guitar
Mark Browne - bass
Matt Chamberlain - drums
Steve Ferrone - percussion, drums
Rami Jaffee - keyboard
Jim Keltner - drums
Greg Leisz - guitar, mandolin, lap steel guitar, pedals
Brian MacLeod - percussion, drum loop
Pino Palladino - bass
John Shanks - dulcimer, guitar, harp, marimba, background vocals
Patrick Warren - keyboard
Gota Yashiki - drum loop

References

Sources 

Melissa Etheridge and Laura Morton: The truth is..., Random House 2002
Greatest Hits: The Road Less Traveled bonus DVD
Lyrics

1999 singles
Melissa Etheridge songs
Songs written by Melissa Etheridge
Songs written by John Shanks
1999 songs
LGBT-related songs
Island Records singles